Thomas J. Holleran (June 24, 1897 – October 21, 1930) was an American football player. He played professionally as a blocking back for two seasons with two different teams of the National Football League (NFL), the Akron Pros in 1920 and the Toledo Maroons in 1922. He died of inflammatory rheumatism on October 21, 1930, at his home in Akron, Ohio.

References

External links
 

1897 births
1930 deaths
American football quarterbacks
Akron Pros players
Toledo Maroons players
Coaches of American football from Ohio
Players of American football from Akron, Ohio